Bílovice-Lutotín is a municipality in Prostějov District in the Olomouc Region of the Czech Republic. It has about 500 inhabitants.

Administrative parts
The municipality is made up of villages of Bílovice and Lutotín.

History
The first written mention of Lutotín is in a deed of bishop Jindřich Zdík from 1141. The first written mention of Bílovice is from 1305.

References

Villages in Prostějov District